JS-3, JS3, or variation, may refer to:

 JS-3 heavy tank, the "Josef Stalin 3" Soviet WWII tank
 Ligier JS3, French sportscar racecar built by Ligier from 1971
 ECMAscript 3.0 (JS3.0), JavaScript standard, see JavaScript
 JScript 3.0 (MS JS 3.0), Microsft Javascript variant, see JScript
 Jonker JS-3 Rapture, a glider

See also
 JSSS (JavaScript Style Sheets)
 3JS, Dutch band
 Three.js, crossplatform Javascript browser library
 WinJS 3.0, Windows Library for JavaScript
 JS (disambiguation)